Faraualla is an Italian female vocal quartet from the region of Apulia, which explores vocal polyphony.

The group was formed in Bari in 1995 and consists of: Gabriella Schiavone, Teresa Vallarella, Marinella Dipalma, & Serena Fortebraccio.

The group also works with the percussionists Cesare Pastanella and Pippo D'Ambrosio.

The group explores the use of voice as a musical instrument, studying and incorporating sounds from a diverse group of places, times and cultures among which are: Apulia, Corsica, Bulgaria and Tahiti, which deal with the traditional music of gypsies, Moravians, Ars Nova, and Southern Italy.
 
Faraualla has performed with various artists of international renown, including the Mongolian Sainkho Namtchylak, the Italo-Palestinian Al Darawish, the American Bobby McFerrin, and the Italians Daniele Sepe and Lucilla Galeazzi. In Italy in 1999 they accompanied the singer Mango in a live concert. In the Visto Così Tour, transmitted directly on Videoitalia Live, they performed as a solo group.

Discography
Faraualla recorded their first two albums under the Amiata Records record label
Faraualla (1999)
 Tonga 
 Vrlicko Kolo 
 Elleipseis
 Szerelem
 Uecumbà
 Maha te song
 Spirits
 Spondo
 Questa fanciull'amor
 Petra
 Eramo in campu
 Fescenne
 Ijsse sole

Sind (2002)
 Domina
 Arecuriuriè
 Masciare
 Sind'
 Popoff
 Ninnagè
 Orangutan
 Viktori
 Masciare witch mix
 
The following album was a live recording of a concert at Cappella Paolina del Qurinale, directly transmitted by RadioTre in December 2001 and published by Rai Trade:
I concerti del Quirinale di RadioTre (2007)
 Uecumbà
 Tonga
 Ebilembilembà
 Uarandero
 Petra
 Sind'
 Arecuriuriè
 Fescenne
 Ijsse sole
 Rumelaj
 Ninnagè
 Popoff
 
This album was published under the Felmay label:
Sospiro (2008)
 Ci lu patiscisti
 Il sogno di Frida
 Rikitikitavi
 Ki te mu
 La notte bianca
 Quingui
 Auanda la cuica
 Smilla
 Pulsatilla
 Il ciucciariello

Ogni Male Fore (2013)
 Zitt Zitt
 Scongiuro
 Il Canto E La Cura
 Spina Spinella
 Sciatavinn
 Da La Vocc
 Tammurriata Della Mascìa
 La Tentazione
 Mano Manca Mano Santa

References

Italian musical groups